The synchronised swimming competition at the 2011 World Aquatics Championships was held from July 17 to July 23.

Schedule

Medal table

Record(*)

Medal summary

References

 
2011 World Aquatics Championships
2011 in synchronized swimming
Synchronised swimming at the World Aquatics Championships